The Graduate School of Economics, Finance, and Management (GSEFM), based in Frankfurt am Main, Germany, is a graduate school offering quantitative and research-oriented graduate-level education programs. It was attended by 250 selected students in 2013.

Structure 
GSEFM is an alliance between Goethe University Frankfurt, Johannes Gutenberg University of Mainz and Technical University of Darmstadt. It is based in the House of Finance at Goethe University’s Campus Westend. Founded in 2008, GSEFM offers a range of doctoral and master programs. Part of the faculty comes from the AACSB-accredited Faculty of Economics and Business Administration of Goethe University. Graduates from the Ph.D. Programs officially obtain the title of "Philosophiae Doctor (Ph.D.)".

PhD Programs 
 PhD in Economics
 PhD in Finance
 Doctorate / PhD Program in Law and Economics
 PhD in Management 
 PhD in Marketing

External links
Graduate School of Economics, Finance, and Management
House of Finance

Goethe University Frankfurt
Universities and colleges in Frankfurt
Educational institutions established in 2008
Postgraduate schools in Germany
Technische Universität Darmstadt
2008 establishments in Germany
Johannes Gutenberg University Mainz